Joanne Da Cunha (born 24 October 1990) is an Indian actress, singer and model. Former "Miss Glowing Skin" crowned at "Pond's Femina Goa 2013". She made her debut as lead actor for Feature Film WELCOME M1LL10NS.

Career 
 Acted in Bollywood movies Welcome M1LL10NS also known as Welcome Millions, Chal Pichchur Banate Hain and Goan feature film "A Night long Nirvana". 
 Featured in music videos "Tumhe Dillagi" by Rahat Fateh Ali Khan, "Cozy Together", "You Walk Alone" by singer Varun Carvalho, "Your Love and My Passion" by Stan Ferns, "Alvia" by Rosario Miranda.
 Won Grape Escapade Queen Contest (2009), Miss Plateaunica at Goa University, and was a finalist for Miss Summer Tulip and Ponds Femina Miss India Goa 2013.
 Modeled for designers like Wendell Rodricks, Rocky S, James Ferreira, Ken Ferns, Ramesh Dembla, Monty Sally, Philu Martins, Verma de Mello and many other accomplished and upcoming designers in India.
 Ramp shows for India Beach Fashion Week, Kingfisher Ultra Style Week, Goa fashion Week, launches of INIFD Fashion Design Institute, Promotion of Bollywood Movies "Help" and "Prague".

Filmography

References

External links
 
 

Living people
Indian film actresses
Actresses in Konkani cinema
People from Porvorim
1990 births
Actresses from Goa
Mount Carmel College, Bangalore alumni